Sauwal is a village and union council of Jhelum District in the Punjab Province of Pakistan. It is part of Pind Dadan Khan Tehsil. Approximately 24,500 people reside in this village.

References 
 Location of Sauwal - Falling Rain Genomics

Villages in Pind Dadan Khan Tehsil
Union councils of Pind Dadan Khan Tehsil
Villages in Jhelum District